Kfar Maimon (lit. Maimon Village) is a religious moshav in southern Israel. Located near Netivot and covering 5,000 dunams, it falls under the jurisdiction of Sdot Negev Regional Council.

History
The village was established in 1959 by a gar'in of Bnei Akiva members and was named after Yehuda Leib Maimon, a signatory of the Israeli declaration of independence and the first Minister of Religions.

In 2005 the village was the site of a non-violent standoff between tens of thousands of protesters against the Gaza disengagement plan, with police encircling the protesters who had started in Netivot to stop them from continuing their march to Israeli settlements in the Gaza Strip.  The mass influx of demonstrators overloaded mobile telephone and other services in the small agricultural village.

The French High School Lycée Thorani is based in the village.

References

Moshavim
Religious Israeli communities
Populated places established in 1959
Gaza envelope
Populated places in Southern District (Israel)
1959 establishments in Israel